Youssef Ramalho Chermiti (born 24 May 2004) is a Portuguese professional footballer who plays as a forward for Primeira Liga club Sporting CP.

Club career
Chermiti is a youth product of Os Marienses, ACF Pauleta, and GD São Pedro, before moving to the youth academy of Sporting CP in 2016. On 22 July 2020, he signed his first professional contract with Sporting for three seasons. He was promoted to their B-team in 2021, but was sidelined with injuries for eight months before training with the senior team in November 2022. He made his professional debut with Sporting in a 2–2 Primeira Liga tie with Benfica on 15 January 2023.

International career
Chermiti was born in Portugal to a Tunisian father and Cape Verdean mother. He is a youth international for Portugal, having played up to the Portugal U19s.

Personal life
Chermiti is the cousin of the Tunisian footballer Amine Chermiti.

Career statistics

References

External links

2004 births
Living people
People from Santa Maria Island
Portuguese footballers
Portugal youth international footballers
Portuguese people of Tunisian descent
Portuguese sportspeople of Cape Verdean descent
Association football forwards
Sporting CP footballers
Sporting CP B players
Primeira Liga players